Artur Gavrilovich Shushenachev (born 7 April 1998) is a Kazakh footballer who plays as a striker for Kairat and the Kazakhstan national team.

Club career
On 26 August 2017, Shushenachev made his debut in a 0–1 away win against Atyrau after coming on as a substitute at 88th minute in place of Chuma Anene. On 3 February 2020, he extended his contract with Kairat until the end of the 2022 season.

International career
Shushenachev has represented Kazakhstan at the under-19, under-21, and senior levels. On 1 September 2021, he made his senior debut in a 2022 FIFA World Cup qualification match against Ukraine.

Career statistics

Club

International

Honours
Kairat
Kazakhstan Premier League: 2020
Kazakhstan Cup: 2021

References

External links

1998 births
Living people
People from Taraz
Kazakhstani footballers
Kazakhstan youth international footballers
Kazakhstan under-21 international footballers
Kazakhstan international footballers
Association football forwards
Kazakhstan Premier League players
FC Kairat players